This is a list of hospitals and other medical facilities in Hong Kong.

Public hospitals
All public hospitals in Hong Kong are managed by the Hospital Authority. They are organised into seven hospital clusters based on their locations.

Hong Kong West Cluster
Grantham Hospital
MacLehose Medical Rehabilitation Centre
Queen Mary Hospital
The Duchess of Kent Children's Hospital at Sandy Bay
Tsan Yuk Hospital
Tung Wah Group of Hospitals Fung Yiu King Hospital
Tung Wah Hospital

Hong Kong East Cluster
Cheshire Home, Chung Hom Kok
Pamela Youde Nethersole Eastern Hospital
Ruttonjee Hospital
St. John Hospital
Tang Shiu Kin Hospital
Tung Wah Eastern Hospital
Wong Chuk Hang Hospital

Kowloon Central Cluster
Hong Kong Buddhist Hospital
Hong Kong Children's Hospital
Hong Kong Eye Hospital
Kowloon Hospital
Kwong Wah Hospital
Our Lady of Maryknoll Hospital
TWGHs Wong Tai Sin Hospital
Queen Elizabeth Hospital
Kai Tak Hospital (under construction)

Kowloon West Cluster 
Caritas Medical Centre
Kwai Chung Hospital
North Lantau Hospital
Princess Margaret Hospital
Yan Chai Hospital

Kowloon East Cluster
Haven of Hope Hospital
Tseung Kwan O Hospital
United Christian Hospital

New Territories East Cluster
Alice Ho Miu Ling Nethersole Hospital
Bradbury Hospice
Cheshire Home, Shatin
North District Hospital
Prince of Wales Hospital
Shatin Hospital
Tai Po Hospital

New Territories West Cluster
Castle Peak Hospital
Pok Oi Hospital
Siu Lam Hospital
Tin Shui Wai Hospital
Tuen Mun Hospital

Private hospitals
 Canossa Hospital
 CUHK Medical Centre
 Evangel Hospital
 Gleneagles Hong Kong Hospital 
 Hong Kong Adventist Hospital – Stubbs Road
 Hong Kong Adventist Hospital – Tsuen Wan
 Hong Kong Baptist Hospital
 Hong Kong Sanatorium & Hospital
 Matilda International Hospital
 Precious Blood Hospital
 St. Paul's Hospital
 St. Teresa's Hospital
 Union Hospital

Teaching hospitals
 CUHK Medical Centre
 Gleneagles Hong Kong Hospital 
 Queen Mary Hospital
 Prince of Wales Hospital
 Prince Philip Dental Hospital

Future hospitals
 Kai Tak Hospital – proposed in 2015 Policy Address, located near Hong Kong Children's Hospital at old Kai Tak Airport site

Defunct hospitals
HMS Minden, 1843–1857
Medical Missionary Hospital Hong Kong, 1843–1853
Seamen's Hospital, 1843–1873
Government Civil Hospital, –1937
Sai Ying Pun Hospital 1937–1978
Lock Hospital, 1858–1894 – venereal diseases hospital
Cheung Chau Fong Bin Hospital, 1872–1988
Royal Naval Hospital, 1873–1949
British Military Hospital, Hong Kong, 1907–1996
Lai Chi Kok Hospital, 1938–2004
Hong Kong Central Hospital, 1966–2012
Nam Long Hospital, 1967–2003
Victoria Hospital, Hong Kong, 1903–1945

See also

List of buildings and structures in Hong Kong
List of hospitals in China
Trent Accreditation Scheme

References

External links

Hospitals

Hospitals
Hong Kong
Hong Kong
Hong Kong
China health-related lists